Molecular Informatics is a peer-reviewed scientific journal published by Wiley VCH. It covers research in cheminformatics, quantitative structure–activity relationships, and combinatorial chemistry. It was established in 1981 as Quantitative Structure-Activity Relationships and renamed to QSAR & Combinatorial Science in 2003, before obtaining its present name in 2010. According to the Journal Citation Reports, the journal has a 2012 impact factor of 2.338.

References

External links 

 
 The QSAR and Modelling Society
 Society of Combinatorial Sciences
 Computational Chemistry List

Chemistry journals
Computer science journals
Cheminformatics
Monthly journals
Wiley (publisher) academic journals
English-language journals